Romantically Challenged is an American sitcom television series that aired on ABC from April 19, 2010, to May 17, 2010. The series is set in Pittsburgh and was created by Ricky Blitt, who is also the show's head writer. It stars Alyssa Milano. On May 16, 2010, ABC officially canceled the series;  six episodes were produced, but only four aired.

Premise
Milano plays Rebecca Thomas, a recently divorced single mom attorney in Pittsburgh who hasn't dated "since Bill Clinton was president". The show will follow her transition from family life to primary bread winner. Milano had stated that the show would most likely be on beyond the 9 p.m. time slot, probably following Dancing with the Stars, saying: "I don't know if it's an 8 o'clock show . . . There are a lot of jokes about sex."

Cast and characters

Main cast
Alyssa Milano – Rebecca Thomas
Kyle Bornheimer – Perry Gill
Josh Lawson – Shawn Goldwater
Kelly Stables – Lisa Thomas
Israel Broussard  – Justin Thomas
Sierra McCormick – Scout Thomas

Episodes

Development and production
In January 2009, ABC announced a put pilot commitment with Ricky Blitt for a new comedy.  Initially titled Threesome, the pilot revolved around a single 30-something man who is caught between his lazy best friend roommate and his single-mother girlfriend. Eric Christian Olsen was the first actor cast, in the leading role of Shawn.  In early March 2009, it was reported that Alyssa Milano would also star in the comedy pilot as Shawn's girlfriend Rebecca. On why she accepted the role, Milano commented:

The cast was filled in mid-March with the casting of Kyle Bornheimer as Shawn's roommate Perry, and Kelly Stables as Lisa, the best friend to Milano's character.

At the end of March, ABC announced the show as Single With Baggage in its 2009 program development guide, and finally as Romantically Challenged in May. In addition, in August 2009 the role of Lisa was described as Rebecca's sister instead of her best friend.

Also in August 2009, ABC announced Romantically Challenged was scheduled for a midseason 2010 run of 13 episodes. In November, this was decreased to a seven episode commitment.  Meanwhile, producers chose to recast the role of Shawn, replacing Olsen with Josh Lawson.  Filming started in January 2010 with James Burrows as director. Shooting took place at the old Seinfeld stage.

Romantically Challenged was initially scheduled for an April 12, 2010 premiere, but ABC delayed the start to April 19 to allow for a two-hour Dancing with the Stars episode.

Setting
Milano has told the press that Pittsburgh was selected since the creator and executive producer Blitt wanted the show set in a "small-town city", and that he is also a "huge Pittsburgh Penguins fan".  Director Burrows also endorsed Pittsburgh since his positive experience filming parts of the former sitcom Back to You in the city.

Reception

Critical reception 
The show's early reviews were mixed. It scored an average of 44 on Metacritic based on 15 reviews. An Entertainment Weekly critic wrote of the opening episodes: "At times relatably funny: The rules of one-night stands can be fairly confusing. But other times, characters say things like 'Who is that mansicle?'" Others were praising the performance of Milano but gave a negative review of the show, like USA Today: "As terrible as Romantically is, it is in the end more puzzling than insulting. Why would any studio or network waste a star like Milano on a show that would seem to have virtually no chance of survival?"

Ratings 
The pilot delivered 'average ratings', with a total of 10.7 million viewers. Although a reasonable amount at another timeslot, the show's future was already feared to be cut short due to its lead-in from Dancing with the Stars, which captured 20.8 million viewers. The four aired episode averaged on 9.57 million viewers per episode and ranked 35th in total viewers and 59th in Adults 18–49 rating and share.

References

External links

2010s American romantic comedy television series
2010s American sitcoms
2010 American television series debuts
2010 American television series endings
American Broadcasting Company original programming
English-language television shows
Television series by Warner Bros. Television Studios
Television shows set in Pittsburgh
Television episodes directed by James Burrows